The LockPickingLawyer is a YouTuber known for picking various locks on camera on his channel of the same name. As of July 2022, the channel has over four million subscribers.

Content 
The channel was started in 2015. In 2018, the channel attracted attention after posting a video of a bicycle lock being cut open in two seconds. Other videos include picking a car lock, though it is noted that the methods used are not capable of starting the car. The channel also accepts challenges sent in by viewers.

Manufacturers have responded to his videos in the past.

Outside YouTube 
The LockPickingLawyer was a lawyer based in the Washington, D.C., metropolitan area, but has since retired from law to focus on security. He works with lock manufacturers to improve the security of their devices. He also sells the tools he uses.

On October 19, 2021, he was a keynote speaker at the security conference SAINTCON 2021.

References 

American YouTubers
YouTube channels launched in 2015
Locksmithing